Christian Lionel Díaz (born 12 May 1976) is an Argentine football manager and former player who played as a left back. He is the current manager of Bolivian club Jorge Wilstermann.

Playing career
Born in Florencio Varela Partido, Buenos Aires, Díaz started his career with Club Atlético Independiente in 1995. In his first season as a professional, he helped El Diablo Rojo win the South American Supercup in an eventual 2–1 aggregate triumph against Clube de Regatas do Flamengo (he did not take part in the final, however). He appeared in more than 150 official games with the club during his five-year spell.

In 2000, Díaz moved to Italy and joined Udinese Calcio, only missing three Serie A matches as the team finished in 12th position. In the following four years he played in Spain, representing RCD Mallorca, Levante UD, Albacete Balompié, Ciudad de Murcia and UD Almería, having little overall impact and only totalling 14 La Liga appearances for the first and the third sides.

Díaz returned to his country in 2005, successively representing Club Olimpo, Club Atlético Huracán and Arsenal de Sarandí, winning two major titles with the latter team including the 2007 Copa Sudamericana. He retired from football in 2009, at the age of 33.

Coaching career
Díaz began working as a manager in March 2012, after succeeding Ramón Díaz at the helm of Independiente. As an interim, he led the team to a 5–4 away win against Boca Juniors in the same month, ending the opposition's 33-match unbeaten run in national competitions; during his tenure at the Estadio Libertadores de América, he also managed an unprecedented four consecutive home victories as well as a 4–1 defeat of Racing Club de Avellaneda in a local derby, but the club was also relegated to the Primera B Nacional even though he left into the season to be replaced by Américo Gallego.

Subsequently, Díaz had abroad stints at Deportes Iquique (Chile) and Club Deportivo Universidad de San Martín de Porres (Peru): he led the former team to the group stage of the Copa Libertadores for the first time ever, and was appointed at the latter on 17 December 2014.

Díaz returned to his country and its top level in February 2016, joining Olimpo. In spite of the side finishing in last place they avoided relegation on the coefficient rule, and he left his post on 4 December.

On 5 April 2017, Díaz signed for Quilmes Atlético Club, this time not being able to prevent relegation to division two. In late June of the following year, he was appointed at Santa Tecla F.C. from the Salvadoran Primera División.

Honours

Player
Udinese
UEFA Intertoto Cup: 2000

Independiente
Supercopa Sudamericana: 1995

Arsenal Sarandí
Copa Sudamericana: 2007
Suruga Bank Championship: 2008

References

External links
Argentine League statistics  

1976 births
Living people
People from Florencio Varela Partido
Argentine people of Spanish descent
Argentine footballers
Association football defenders
Argentine Primera División players
Club Atlético Independiente footballers
Club Atlético Huracán footballers
Olimpo footballers
Arsenal de Sarandí footballers
Serie A players
Udinese Calcio players
La Liga players
Segunda División players
RCD Mallorca players
Levante UD footballers
Albacete Balompié players
Ciudad de Murcia footballers
UD Almería players
Argentine expatriate footballers
Expatriate footballers in Italy
Expatriate footballers in Spain
Argentine expatriate sportspeople in Italy
Argentine expatriate sportspeople in Spain
Argentine football managers
Argentine Primera División managers
Club Atlético Independiente managers
Quilmes Atlético Club managers
Peruvian Primera División managers
Universidad San Martín managers
The Strongest managers
Argentine expatriate football managers
Expatriate football managers in Chile
Expatriate football managers in Peru
Expatriate football managers in El Salvador
Expatriate football managers in Bolivia
Sportspeople from Buenos Aires Province
Royal Pari F.C. managers
Deportes Iquique managers